Albert A Langford (1874-date of death unknown), was a Canadian international lawn bowls player who competed in the 1934 British Empire Games.

Bowls career
At the 1934 British Empire Games he won the silver medal in the pairs event with William Hutchinson.

Personal life
He was a merchant by trade. He was resident at the Strand Hotel during the Games along with the most of the other Canadian bowlers and travelled to the event with his wife Loretta.

References

Canadian male bowls players
Bowls players at the 1934 British Empire Games
Commonwealth Games silver medallists for Canada
Commonwealth Games medallists in lawn bowls
1874 births
Year of death missing
Medallists at the 1934 British Empire Games